Jean Johnson may refer to:

Jean Johnson (singer)
Jean Bassett Johnson, anthropologist
Jean Johnson, character in Cheetah (1989 film)
Jean Johnson (writer), Philip K. Dick Award nominee

See also
Gene Johnson (disambiguation)
John Johnson (disambiguation)